Kai Aareleid (born 26 September 1972 in Tartu) is an Estonian prose writer, poet and translator.

1991-1997 she studied stagecraft at Theatre Academy Helsinki and graduated from a master's degree.

1996-2006 she worked as an administrative assistant at the British Council office in Tallinn.

2012-2017 she was an editor for the Loomingu Raamatukogu.

Works
 2011: novel "Vene veri" ('Russian Blood')
 2012: short story "Tango"
 2015: poetry collection "Naised teel" ('Women on the Road') 
 2015: poetry collection "Vihm ja vein" ('Rain and Wine')
 2016: novel "Linnade põletamine" ('The Burning of Cities')

References

External links
 Kai Aareleid at Estonian Writers' Online Dictionary

Living people
1972 births
Estonian translators
21st-century Estonian women writers
Estonian women poets
21st-century Estonian poets
Tallinn University alumni
Writers from Tartu